Camponotini is a tribe containing 2 extinct ant genera and 8 extant ant genera, including Camponotus (carpenter ants).

Genera
 Calomyrmex Emery, 1895
 Camponotus Mayr, 1861
 †Chimaeromyrma Dlussky, 1988
 Colobopsis Mayr, 1861
 Dinomyrmex Ashmead, 1905
 Echinopla Smith, 1857
 Opisthopsis Dalla Torre, 1893
 Overbeckia Viehmeyer, 1916
 Polyrhachis Smith, 1857
 †Pseudocamponotus Carpenter, 1930

References

Formicinae
Ant tribes